Ayleo Bowles and Mateo Bowles, better known as Ayo & Teo, are a duo of dancers and musicians from Ann Arbor, Michigan. They have appeared in music videos for Usher's "No Limit" and Chris Brown's "Party". Their banger song "Rolex" peaked at number 20 on the US Billboard Hot 100.

Early life 
Ayleo Bowles (Ayo) and Mateo Bowles (Teo) were born in Ann Arbor, Michigan. They both attended Ypsilanti Community High School.

The duo taught themselves how to dance from watching other artists like Usher, Kida, Skitzo, and Matt Chad and movies like Breakin' and Step Up.

Rise to fame
They made their YouTube on November 14, 2011 and made a video in 2016.
The duo started out by posting videos on social media. They rose to fame with their 2017 single "Rolex," which charted onto the Billboard Hot 100 at number 20. The song went viral, and the brothers moved to Atlanta to pursue to their music career. They signed to Columbia Records in 2017.

They have performed at the 2016 BET Awards and have had several music video appearances, with artists like Usher, Chris Brown, Lil Yachty, and others. The duo are known for their use of masks in their outfits.

Discography

Singles

Extended plays

Studio Albums

See also
 List of dancers

References

African-American musical groups
African-American male dancers
African-American dancers
American male dancers
American hip hop groups
American musical duos
Musical groups from Michigan
Sibling musical duos
Male musical duos
People from Ann Arbor, Michigan
Musicians from Ann Arbor, Michigan